Stefanie de Além da Eira (born 25 September 1992) is a professional footballer who plays as an attacking midfielder for Spanish Primera División club Sporting de Huelva and the Switzerland national team – she has also represented Portugal at international level.

Early life
Da Eira was born in Thun to Portuguese parents.

Club career
Da Eira has played for FC Thun, FC Basel, FC Zürich, Grasshopper Club Zürich and BSC Young Boys in Switzerland and for Real Betis in Spain.

International career
Da Eira played for the Switzerland women's national under-19 football team at the 2010 UEFA Women's Under-19 Championship first qualifying round. She represented Portugal at the UEFA Women's Euro 2013 qualifying and Switzerland at the 2023 FIFA Women's World Cup qualification (UEFA Group G).

References

External links
Profile at La Liga

1992 births
Living people
People from Thun
Swiss women's footballers
Women's association football midfielders
FC Thun players
FC Basel Frauen players
FC Zürich Frauen players
Grasshopper Club Zürich (women) players
BSC YB Frauen players
Real Betis Féminas players
Swiss Women's Super League players
Primera División (women) players
Switzerland women's international footballers
Swiss expatriate women's footballers
Swiss expatriate sportspeople in Spain
Expatriate women's footballers in Spain
Swiss people of Portuguese descent
Citizens of Portugal through descent
Portuguese women's footballers
Portugal women's international footballers
Dual internationalists (women's football)
Portuguese expatriate women's footballers
Portuguese expatriate sportspeople in Spain
Sportspeople from the canton of Bern